The Central South African Railways Class C 2-8-4T of 1900 was a South African steam locomotive from the pre-Union era in Transvaal.

In 1900, during the Second Boer War, the Imperial Military Railways experienced a shortage of locomotives and six  Berkshire type tank locomotives, destined for the Western Australian Government Railways, were diverted to South Africa where they became known as the Western Australians. In 1902, they came onto the roster of the Central South African Railways and were designated Class C.

The Second Boer War
In 1899, when the Second Boer War broke out, the invading British military forces took control of all railways in the colonies of the Cape of Good Hope and Natal. As possession was obtained, this control was extended to the railways of the Oranje-Vrijstaat Gouwerment-Spoorwegen (OVGS) in the Orange Free State and the Nederlandsche-Zuid-Afrikaansche Spoorweg-Maatschappij (NZASM) in the Zuid-Afrikaansche Republiek (ZAR).

On 7 October 1899, Lieutenant-Colonel E.P.C. Girouard KCMG DSO RE, a Canadian serving in the Royal Engineers and, at the time, the President of the Egyptian State Railways, was appointed as Director of Railways for the South African Field Forces.

While Girouard largely left control of the two colonial railways in the hands of their civilian staff, the railways of the two Boer Republics were worked under the title of Imperial Military Railways (IMR), with civilian and military personnel appointed by him.

Origin and manufacturer
The damage which was inflicted on the railways during hostilities and the trans­portation demands of the British military led to a shortage of locomotives. To alleviate the shortage, a shipment of six new  tank locomotives with a  Berkshire type wheel arrangement were diverted to the IMR in South Africa. They had been built for the Western Australian Government Railways (WAGR) by Neilson, Reid & Company in 1900.

Characteristics
Their cylinders were inclined and arranged outside the  plate frames. The steam chests were arranged between the frames and the unbalanced slide valves were actuated by Stephenson valve gear through rocker shafts.

Service

Imperial Military Railways
The IMR numbered the locomotives in the range from 100 to 105 and, since they were not classified, they became commonly known as the Western Australians.

Central South African Railways
Peace was declared on 1 June 1902 and, on 1 July 1902, the railways were handed back to civilian authority. The IMR was transformed into the Central South African Railways (CSAR), which took control of all railways in the Transvaal and the Orange Free State. Girouard remained on as Commissioner of Railways and the NZASM went into liquidation.

Mr. P.A. Hyde was appointed as Chief Locomotive Superintendent of the CSAR. One of the first steps to be taken was to classify and renumber all the locomotive stock, with tank locomotives classified alphabetically and tender locomotives numerically. Since the classification was done in increasing order of weight, the Western Australians were designated Class C, after the NZASM 40 Tonner (Class A) and 46 Tonner (Class B). The Western Australians were renumbered in the range from 203 to 208.

The locomotives were not popular with the crews. As a result of their small coupled wheels and short connecting rods, they were found to ride roughly at speed. The CSAR therefore decided to use them as shunting engines until they were either disposed of or scrapped.

By 1912, after the South African Railways (SAR) was established, these locomotives were considered obsolete and were not included in the SAR classification and renumbering list, but recommended for scrapping even though they were still less than twelve years old.

Industry
Three of the locomotives did survive, however, two having been sold in 1904 to Clydesdale Collieries at Coalbrook in the northern Orange Free State and one to Ogies Colliery near Witbank. It survived at the colliery until 1972.

Works numbers
The CSAR Class C works numbers, renumbering and disposition are listed in the table.

Illustration

References

0470
2-8-4 locomotives
1′D2′ locomotives
2-8-4T locomotives
Neilson Reid locomotives
Cape gauge railway locomotives
Railway locomotives introduced in 1900
1900 in South Africa
Scrapped locomotives